The Enemy Property Act, 1968 is an Act of the Parliament of India, which enables and regulates the appropriation of property in India owned by Pakistani nationals. The act was passed following the Indo-Pakistani War of 1965. Ownership is passed to the Custodian of Enemy Property for India, a government department. There are also movable properties categorized as enemy properties.

Amendments: Enemy Property (Amendment and Validation) Act, 2017
Minister of State for Home Affairs Kiren Rijiju in Modi Government introduced the Enemy Property (Amendment and Validation) Bill, 2016. The measure seeks to replace an ordinance promulgated to this effect on 7 January 2016.

The 2016 bill seeks to do the following:
 The Bill amends the Enemy Property Act, 1968, to vest all rights, titles and interests over enemy property in the Custodian of the Enemy Property for India.
 The Bill declares transfer of enemy property by the enemy, conducted under the Act, to be void. This applies retrospectively to transfers that have occurred before or after 1968.
 The Bill prohibits civil courts and other authorities from entertaining disputes related to enemy property.

The Bill was passed by the Rajya Sabha on 10 March 2017. The Bill, with amendments made in the Rajya Sabha, was passed by the Lok Sabha on 14 March 2017.

See also 
 Custodian for Enemy Property for India, for the government takeover of property of rulers who migrated to Pakistan
 Political integration of India
 Central Wakf Council
 Evacuee Trust Property Board
 Privy Purse in India

References

Law of India
Modi administration
Indira Gandhi administration